"Me Enamora" (English: It Makes Me Fall in Love) is a song written and performed by Colombian singer and songwriter, Juanes. The song is the first radio single of his fourth solo studio album La Vida... Es Un Ratico (2007) and it received three awards for Record of the Year, Song of the Year and Best Short Form Music Video at the Latin Grammy Awards of 2008. The song was included in the game Rock Band 3. In 2012, Juanes re-released the single with a new version, that was performed on his album MTV Unplugged. On 14 May 2012, it was made available on iTunes. The song was included at No. 26 on MTV Tres's Top 100 of 2012.

Chart performance
The song debuted at number-one on the U.S. Billboard Hot Latin Tracks, one of the few songs to do so, in the week of 29 September 2007. This single spent 20 non-consecutive weeks at number one on the Hot Latin Tracks charts. Only one single had spent more weeks at number 1 on this chart: "La Tortura", by fellow Colombian performer Shakira featuring Alejandro Sanz, which stayed on top for 25 weeks. It reached number 1 on 14 countries.

In Mexico, a preloaded bundle of audio and video tracks including "Me Enamora", "La Vida Es Un Ratico", "Gotas de Agua Dulce" and "Webisode" was certified 2×Platinum+Gold by Asociación Mexicana de Productores de Fonogramas y Videogramas (AMPROFON) for selling 250,000 unites.

Track listing
CD single
"Me Enamora" – 3:14 (Single Version)

Maxi single
"Me Enamora" – 3:13
"Vulnerable" – 4:26
"Fíjate Bien" – 4:51
Un Día Normal" – 3:42

iTunes Digital Download
"Me Enamora (MTV Unplugged)" – 3:20

Charts and certifications

Weekly charts

Year-end charts

All-time charts

Certifications

Me Enamora (MTV Unplugged)

Juanes re-released the single with a new version, that was performed on his MTV Unplugged. On 14 May 2012 is available on iTunes. This version was nominated for Rock/Alternative Song of the Year at the Premio Lo Nuestro 2013.

Track listing

Charts

Weekly charts

References

2007 singles
2007 songs
2012 singles
2012 songs
Juanes songs
Latin Grammy Award for Record of the Year
Latin Grammy Award for Song of the Year
Songs written by Juanes
Number-one singles in Spain
Record Report Top Latino number-one singles
Universal Music Latino singles
Latin Grammy Award for Best Short Form Music Video
Song recordings produced by Gustavo Santaolalla